Rooster Sailing Ltd is a sailing wear company based in England.

History
Rooster was founded in 1999 by Steve Cockerill, a British dinghy sailor in the Graduate, 470, Cadet, Europe, Laser and RS300 classes.

References

External links
 Official website

Sportswear brands
Clothing companies of the United Kingdom
Companies based in Hampshire
British companies established in 1999
Clothing companies established in 1999
Sailing equipment manufacturers